Fathers is a 2020 Cambodian drama film directed by Huy Yaleng. It was selected as the Cambodian entry for the Best International Feature Film at the 93rd Academy Awards, but it was not nominated.

Cast
 Chy Chhenhlin
 Sonyta Mean
 Kong Sophy
 Huy Yaleng

See also
 List of submissions to the 93rd Academy Awards for Best International Feature Film
 List of Cambodian submissions for the Academy Award for Best International Feature Film

References

External links
 

2020 films
2020 drama films
Cambodian drama films
Khmer-language films